The Cool Mikado is a British musical film released in 1963, directed by Michael Winner (who makes a short appearance as an airline passenger à la Hitchcock near the start of the film), and produced by Harold Baim, with music arranged by Martin Slavin and John Barry. It starred Frankie Howerd as Ko-Ko, Lionel Blair and Stubby Kaye. The script was written by Michael Winner, from an adaptation by Maurice Browning.  
 
Based on the 1885 Gilbert and Sullivan comic opera The Mikado, the plot is reset into contemporary Japan as a comic gangster story. The dialogue is largely rewritten, and several of the well-known musical items are omitted. The music that remains is re-orchestrated into styles popular in the early 1960s, including the twist, and the Cha-Cha-Cha.

Filmed entirely on a sound stage, stock footage was used to provide Japanese atmosphere between scenes. This footage looks like one of the many travelogues for which producer Baim is best known, but according to Winner's autobiography this footage was specially shot. Winner credits the film's problems to the fact it was underfunded. No attempt appears to have been made to disguise the stage-bound filming. The colourful sparsely dressed sets, not always tending towards realism, give the film a surreal quality.

This film was Frankie Howerd's first musical, and it led to him starring in A Funny Thing Happened on the Way to the Forum on stage and in several conventional Gilbert and Sullivan productions, including Sir Joseph Porter in H.M.S. Pinafore and the Learned Judge in Trial by Jury. However, Howerd said that "not only was it the worst film ever made, but was the one production in show-business that I'm positively ashamed to have appeared in."

Music
The following music and styles appear in the film. Except for the ‘Mikado’s Song’, containing some topical lines, lyrics are unchanged. Although heavily re-orchestrated, the melodies were left essentially intact.

 "The Sun and I" – instrumental twist used for the opening credits
 "We are Gentlemen of Japan" – male chorus in a ‘Tijuana brass’ type setting 
 "Bellow of the Blast" – featured instrumental played in the style of a ‘strip’ tune
 "Three Little Maids" – female trio, set as a Cha-Cha-Cha followed by a featured dance
 "Overture extract" – a twist and used as incidental music
 "The Sun and I" – female solo
 "A Wandering Minstrel" – male solo in a crooner style
 "Lord High Executioner" – chorus with a ‘Tijuana brass’ backing
 "Finale Act 1" – extract set in a jazzy style and used as a short dance routine
 "The Sun and I" – instrumental twist used as incidental music
 "Here’s a Howdy do" – duet sung as a Cha-Cha-Cha
 "A Wandering Minstrel" – instrumental small jazz combo arrangement used as incidental music
 "This I’ll Never Do" – duet
 Overture extract" – instrumental quickstep
 "Tit Willow" – instrumental twist, a featured dance routine
 Overture extract" – instrumental in a jazz style
 "The Mikado’s Song" – male solo, some updated lyrics
 "Bellow of the Blast" – instrumental jitterbug used as incidental music
 "Flowers that bloom in the Spring" – various solos, set as a jitterbug and a featured dance performed in a snow storm
 "We are Gentlemen of Japan" – played on bagpipes
 "He’s Gone and Married Yum Yum" – chorus in a jazzy style.

Synopsis
Hank, the son of American judge Herbert Mikado, refuses to marry Katie Shaw, whom his father wishes him to marry, and so joins the army. He is stationed in Japan where he falls in love with a Tokyo art student, Yum-Yum. However, her fiancé, Ko-Ko, an American gangster operating in Japan, is determined to keep Hank and Yum-Yum apart.  Hank's father had also sentenced Ko-Ko's brother to prison.

Cast
Frankie Howerd ...  Ko-Ko Flintridge 
Stubby Kaye ...  Judge Herbert Mikado / Charlie Hotfleisch 
Mike Winters ...  Mike 
Bernie Winters ...  Bernie 
Tommy Cooper ...  Pooh-Bah, Private Detective 
Dennis Price ...  Ronald Fortescue
Peter Barkworth ... Fanshaw 
Jacqueline Jones ...  Katie Shaw 
Kevin Scott ...  Hank Mikado 
Jill Mai Meredith ...  Yum-Yum 
Burt Kwouk ... Art School Teacher
Lionel Blair ...  Nanki 
Pete Murray ...  Man #1 in Boudoir
Ed Bishop ... Man #2 in Boudoir 
Tsai Chin ...  Pitti-Sing 
Glen Mason ...  Harry 
Dermot Walsh ...  Elmer 
Carole Shelley ...  Mrs. Smith 
C. Denier Warren ...  Mr. Smith 
Yvonne Shima ...  Peep-Bo 
Kenji Takaki ...  Ho Ho
The John Barry Seven ...  Themselves

Production
In May 1958, The New York Times reported that Don Walker was working on an updated version of The Mikado called The Cool Mikado. Harry Squires was to produce. Walker then became committed to the musical First Impressions meaning Cool Mikado was postponed.

Producer Harold Baim decided to make a film of The Cool Mikado. He said the 1936 version of the original operetta "didn't make a bean" so was keen to update it. He hired Martin Slavin to redo the music. The director was Michael Winner who said "we have taken what is lasting in The Mikado and firmly junked the rest."

The film was shot at Shepperton Studios in July 1962. Bernie Winters says his scenes took three days "and I spent most of that time trying to keep Mike from punching the director."

Bain hoped to follow it with versions of The Gondoliers and Pirates of Penzance.

Winner told the Los Angeles Times in 1970 that the experience prompted him to start initiating his own material, so he hired a writer to write The System which was his breakthrough film.

Reception
The Monthly Film Bulletin reviewer called it "thoroughly slapdash."

Frankie Howerd told Barry Took in 1992 the film "had the appearance of being made in a wind tunnel. Nobody could make any sense of it and I can say without equivocation that not only was it the worst film ever made but the one production in showbusiness I'm positively ashamed to have appeared in... it was absolutely incomprehensible gibberish."

Howerd added: "That was the worst film I’ve ever done. I’d say it was  one of the worst films ever made. It was shot in a month and I was in it for two weeks. I didn’t get much money for it. But I needed the money at that time because I wasn’t doing very well. Also, I hadn’t done a film for some time. It was a good idea had it been done properly. All sorts of people were in it such as Tommy Cooper, Pete Murray, Mike and Bernie Winters and it should have been much better than it was. But the script was appalling. It made no sense because if you’ve got no script, you’ve got nothing because the script is everything."

Andrew Roberts in The Independent in 2013 wrote: "Who else but Winner could have directed a musical containing the rousing number 'Tit Willow Twist', as played by the John Barry Seven and as interpreted by Lionel Blair and His Dancers? To this day, Winner's bold attempt to combine Gilbert and Sullivan with the comic talents of Mike and Bernie Winters stands as a prime example of how British cinema can, occasionally but always memorably, produce films that are the celluloid equivalent of those relatives who are only wheeled out at family weddings, and who are then studiously avoided at the reception."

References

External links

"The Cool Mikado (1962)" at A Gilbert and Sullivan Discography

1963 films
1963 musical films
British musical films
Films based on works by Gilbert and Sullivan
Films directed by Michael Winner
Films scored by John Barry (composer)
Films with screenplays by Michael Winner
Films set in Japan
1960s English-language films
1960s British films